A chief petty officer (CPO) is a senior non-commissioned officer in many navies and coast guards.

Canada
"Chief petty officer" refers to two ranks in the Royal Canadian Navy. A chief petty officer 2nd class (CPO2) (premier maître de deuxième classe or pm2 in French) is equivalent to a master warrant officer in the Army and Air Force, and chief petty officer 1st class (CPO1) (premier maître de première classe or pm1) is equivalent to a chief warrant officer in the Army and Air Force. In spoken references, chief petty officers may be addressed as "chief" but are never addressed as "sir".

Australia
"Chief Petty Officer" is the second highest non-commissioned rank in the Royal Australian Navy.

India

A Chief Petty Officer in Indian Navy is a junior-commissioned officer, equivalent to the NATO rank enlisted grade of E-6 ( Staff Sergeant ) . This rank is equivalent to Naib Subedar in Indian Army and Junior Warrant Officer in Indian Air force. The two highest enlisted ranks are Master Chief Petty Officer Second Class (MCPO II), equivalent to E-7/Subedar/Warrant Officer and Master Chief Petty Officer First Class (MCPO I), equivalent to E-8/Subedar Major/Master Warrant Officer in NATO/Indian Army/Indian Air Force respectively.

Pakistan
Fleet chief petty officer is a commissioned and gazetted rank in Pakistan Navy above chief petty officer and below master chief petty officer. It is equivalent to the Pakistan Air Force warrant officer and the Pakistan Army subedar.

Philippines

In the Philippine Navy, the rank of chief petty officer, is equivalent to master sergeant in the Philippine Marine Corps and Philippine Air Force.

United Kingdom
In the Royal Navy, the rank of chief petty officer comes above that of petty officer and below that of warrant officer class 2. It is the equivalent of colour sergeant in the Royal Marines, colour sergeant or staff sergeant in the Army, and flight sergeant in the Royal Air Force.

United States

Chief petty officer is the seventh enlisted rank in the U.S. Navy and U.S. Coast Guard, just above petty officer first class and below senior chief petty officer. Chief petty officers are classified as senior non-commissioned officers. The grade of chief petty officer was established on April 1, 1893, for the U.S. Navy. The U.S. Congress first authorized the U.S. Coast Guard to use the promotion to chief petty officer on 18 May 1920.

Unlike petty officer first class and lower rates, advancement to chief petty officer in the U.S. Navy not only carries requirements of time in service, superior evaluation scores, and specialty examinations, but also carries an added requirement of peer review. A chief petty officer can only advance after review by a selection board of serving master chief petty officers, in effect "choosing their own" and conversely not choosing others.

Insignia

See also
 Comparative military ranks
 List of United States Navy enlisted rates
 List of United States Coast Guard enlisted rates

References

External links
History of the Chief Petty Officer Grade

 
Marine occupations
Military ranks of Australia
Military ranks of Canada
Military ranks of the Commonwealth
Military ranks of the Royal Navy
Naval ranks
Non-commissioned officers